Chipstead railway station serves the village of Chipstead in Surrey. It is a late-Victorian station on the Tattenham Corner Line and was opened in 1897. The station and all trains serving it are operated by Southern.

The station buildings are no longer used by Southern, having been sold off and converted for private use in the mid-late 1990s, and a small ticket office is in a pre-fabricated building on the Up platform.

Services
All services at Chipstead are operated by Southern using  EMUs.

The typical off-peak service in trains per hour is:
 2 tph to 

On Sundays, the service is reduced to hourly and runs between Tattenham Corner and  only. Passengers for London Bridge have to change at Purley.

References

External links

Railway stations in Surrey
Former South Eastern Railway (UK) stations
Railway stations in Great Britain opened in 1897
Railway stations served by Govia Thameslink Railway